The European Astronomical Society (EAS) is a learned society, founded under the Swiss Civil Code in 1990, as an association to contribute and promote the advancement of astronomy in Europe, and to deal with astronomical matters at a European level. It is a society of individual professional astronomers, and all European astronomers can be members independently of their field of work or country of work or origin. The society offers a forum for discussion on all aspects of astronomical development in Europe, and is the organisation that represents the interests of astronomers in discussions of European-wide developments.

Maarten Baes (Belgium) serves as the EAS Newsletter editor.

Presidents
The President of the European Astronomical Society chairs the governing Council of the EAS and liaises with similar societies in countries around the world, and with the International Astronomical Union on behalf of the European astronomy community.
The first person to hold the title of President of the European Astronomical Society was Lodewijk Woltjer, a post he held from the founding of the EAS until 1994. The post has a term of office of four years, the same as the other offices on the governing Council of the Society, and the office transfers from the incumbent at the conclusion of the final EAS Annual Meeting of their term.  and Roger Davies are the only holders to have been re-elected for a second term.

The current president is Roger Davies (Oxford, UK), who took up the role in 2017.

Prizes
The European Astronomical Society awards several prizes on an annual or biannual basis.

See also
 List of astronomical societies

References

External links

Astronomy in Europe
Astronomy organizations
Pan-European scientific societies
1990 establishments in Switzerland